Fernando de Oliveira Saez (born 2 October 1974 in Rio de Janeiro) is a former international freestyle swimmer from Brazil. He participated for his native country at the 1996 Summer Olympics. He is currently a swimming teacher and coordinator of the Academia da Praia and of the swimming school he has with fellow Olympian Luiz Lima.

He was a swimming athlete for the Fluminense when he won the silver medal at the 1995 Pan American Games in Mar del Plata, in the 4x200 meter freestyle relay. He also defended the  Vasco da Gama and the  Flamengo. 

At the 1995 FINA World Swimming Championships (25 m) done in Rio de Janeiro, he won the bronze medal in the 4×200-metre freestyle.   He also swam the 400-metre freestyle. 

At the 1996 Summer Olympics in Atlanta, he finished 10th in the 4×200-metre freestyle.

He was at the 1997 FINA World Swimming Championships (25 m), where he finished 11th in the 200-metre freestyle, and 15th in the 400-metre freestyle.

Saez participated in the 2000 FINA World Swimming Championships (25 m), in Athens, where he finished 8th in the 4×200-metre freestyle final.

References

External links 
 

1974 births
Living people
Brazilian male freestyle swimmers
Swimmers at the 1996 Summer Olympics
Olympic swimmers of Brazil
Swimmers from Rio de Janeiro (city)
Medalists at the FINA World Swimming Championships (25 m)
20th-century Brazilian people
21st-century Brazilian people